The 2005–06 season was Bihor Oradea's 47th season in the Romanian football league system, and their 27th season in the Divizia B. At the end of the season the team finished on 2nd place and qualified for the Divizia A promotion play-off that was held on Lia Manoliu Stadium from Bucharest. FC Bihor played against the 2nd places from the other series, Forex Brașov and Unirea Urziceni, but failed to promoted. FC Bihor's 47th seasons was another agitated one, with a lot of changes in the managerial and technical staff, also for promotion was a tough fight against another team from Bihor County, Liberty Salonta, which finished 1st. FC Bihor lost the play-off and Liberty sold its first division place to UTA Arad, so from 2 potential teams in the first league, the county remained with none.

First team squad

Pre-season and friendlies

Competitions

Seria III

Result round by round

Results

Promotion play-off

Cupa României

See also

2005–06 Cupa României
Divizia B

Notes and references

FC Bihor Oradea seasons
FC Bihor Oradea